Sundanese Wednesday which popularised Rebo Nyunda is a program of thematic days in Bandung, West Java, Indonesia. Every Wednesday, people in Bandung talk Sundanese in their communication and also wear Sundanese clothes. Bandung Government developed this program to conserve Sundanese culture as their local culture. Now, this program is not only held in Bandung, but Garut and Bogor also.

References 

Bandung
Sundanese language